Joseph Stewart or Stuart was a Union Army soldier in the American Civil War who received the U.S. military's highest decoration, the Medal of Honor, for his actions at the Battle of Five Forks.

Born in Ireland, Stewart gave Baltimore, Maryland, as his home of record when he joined the U.S. Army on September 30, 1864. He served during the Civil War as a private in Company G of the 1st Maryland Infantry Regiment. At the Battle of Five Forks on April 1, 1865, Stewart captured a flag. For this action, he was awarded the Medal of Honor weeks later on April 27, 1865. His official citation reads simply: "Capture of flag." Stewart was discharged from the Army on June 3, 1865.

Stewart is one of the hundreds of Medal of Honor recipients who are considered "lost to history", as his place of burial and other biographical details are unknown.

References 

Year of birth missing
Year of death missing
Military personnel from Baltimore
People of Maryland in the American Civil War
Union Army soldiers
United States Army Medal of Honor recipients
American Civil War recipients of the Medal of Honor
Irish-born Medal of Honor recipients